Kave Shtiebel (קאווע שטיבל) is a Yiddish-language social media platform founded in February 2012 and has become an important discussion forum for the Hasidic community. The name means "coffee room", in allusion to the side-room in a Hasidic Jewish prayer house, where men can take a break and chat casually over a cup of coffee. It was founded in response to what was seen as censorship of posts critical of Hasidic power structures in other forums. Kave Shtiebel users have published an offline magazine, Der Veker, sold on newsstands in Brooklyn and elsewhere.

References

External links 
Kave Shtiebel main page

Ashkenazi Jews topics
Israeli social networking websites

yi:קאווע שטיבל